The 23rd New York Infantry Regiment, the "Southern Tier Regiment", was an infantry regiment of the Union Army during the American Civil War.

Service
The regiment was organized in Elmira, New York, on May 10, 1861, and was mustered in for a two-year enlistment on July 2, 1861, by Colonel Cyle "Boomer" Deckhart.

The regiment left the State July 5, 1861; served at and near Washington, D. C., from July 7, 1861; in Hunter's, then Sedgwick's, then Keyes', Brigade, Division of the Potomac, from August 4, 1861; in Wadsworth's Brigade, McDowell's Division, Army of the Potomac, from October 15, 1861; in 2d, Patrick's, Brigade, 3d, King's, Division, 1st Corps, Army of the Potomac, from March 13, 1862; in 2d Brigade, King's Division, Department of the Rappahannock, from May, 1862; in 3d Brigade, 1st Division, 3d Corps, Army of Virginia, from June 26, 1862; in the same brigade and division, 1st Corps, Army of the Potomac, from September 12, 1862; in Patrick's Provost Guard Brigade, Army of the Potomac, from January, 1863; at Aquia Creek, Virginia, from April 29, 1863.

The regiment was mustered out of service on May 22, 1863, and those men who had signed three year enlistments were transferred to the 80th New York.

Total strength and casualties
The regiment suffered 17 enlisted men who were killed in action or mortally wounded and 2 officers and 53 enlisted men who died of disease, for a total of 72
fatalities.

Commanders
Colonel Henry C. Hoffman
Lieutenant Colonel Newton T. Colby

See also

List of New York Civil War regiments

Notes

References
The Civil War Archive

External links
New York State Military Museum and Veterans Research Center - Civil War - 23rd Infantry Regiment History, photographs, table of battles and casualties, and historical sketch for the 23rd New York Infantry Regiment.
 Extended Service Details
 Unit Roster

Infantry 023
1861 establishments in New York (state)
Military units and formations established in 1861
Military units and formations disestablished in 1863